Hotel Georgia is a 12-story historic hotel located at 801 West Georgia Street in the city's downtown core of Vancouver, British Columbia, Canada.

History

It was opened on May 7, 1927. The architects were Robert T. Garrow and John Graham Sr.

Sold in early 2007 by owner Allied Hotel Properties Inc, the hotel, then operating as the Crowne Plaza Hotel Georgia underwent restoration and was unveiled on July 15, 2011, as Rosewood Hotel Georgia, managed by Rosewood Hotels & Resorts. In the process of the renovation, its 313 rooms were reduced to 155. The building and many portions of the interior are designated as a protected heritage property by the City of Vancouver. The interior design for the renovation was by Toronto-based design firm, Munge Leung. It is a registered cultural heritage site in Canada, with the number 11158 in the Canadian Register of Historic Places.

Notable guests
 Nat King Cole
 Prince of Wales (later the Duke of Windsor)
 Elvis Presley
 Jack Carter
 LeBron James
 Louis Armstrong
 The Beatles (decoy booking to avoid fans) 
 Queen Elizabeth II and Prince Philip
 Errol Flynn died while a guest at the hotel in 1959 (though not in the hotel, but at the nearby apartment of a friend)
 John Wayne

The Private Residences at Hotel Georgia

A 48-story, 158.5 metre, high-rise residential building has been constructed on the adjoining site of the hotel's parking structure. It is the 3rd tallest tower in the city, after the Living Shangri-La Tower and the Paradox Hotel and Tower. All three of these developments are new mixed use hotel/residences towers on Georgia Street.

See also
List of heritage buildings in Vancouver
List of tallest buildings in Vancouver
List of tallest buildings in British Columbia

References

External links

 Official Site of Rosewood Hotel Georgia
 Official Site of The Private Residences at Hotel Georgia
  Redevelopment Report 2007 (PDF)
 Minutes of meeting regarding current development plans (2007)
 Development Board Report for Expansion (2003)- not implemented

Hotel buildings completed in 1927
Hotels in Vancouver
Heritage buildings in Vancouver
1927 establishments in British Columbia